Monopeltis rhodesiana is a species of amphisbaenian in the family Amphisbaenidae. The species is native to southern Africa.

Geographic range
M. rhodesiana is found in southern Malawi, central Mozambique, southern Zambia, and northwestern Zimbabwe.

Habitat
The preferred natural habitat of M. rhodesiana is mesic savanna, with alluvial soil.

Description
M. rhodesiana is pinkish, both dorsally and ventrally. The tail is short, with only 5–9 caudal annuli.

Reproduction
The mode of reproduction of M. rhodesiana is unknown.

References

Further reading
Broadley DG (1997). "A review of the Monopeltis capensis complex in southern Africa (Reptilia: Amphisbaenidae)". African Journal of Herpetology 46 (1): 1–12.
Broadley DG, Gans C, Visser J (1976). "Studies on Amphisbaenians (Amphisbaenia, Reptilia). 6. The Genera Monopeltis and Dalophia in Southern Africa". Bulletin of the American Museum of Natural History 157: 311–486. (Monopeltis capensis rhodesianus, new subspecies, pp. 394–398, Figures 56–59).
Gans C (2005). "Checklist and Bibliography of the Amphisbaenia of the World". Bull. American Mus. Nat. Hist. (289): 1–130. (Monopeltis rhodesianus, p. 37).

Monopeltis
Reptiles of Zimbabwe
Reptiles of Zambia
Reptiles of Mozambique
Reptiles of Malawi
Reptiles described in 1976
Taxa named by Donald George Broadley
Taxa named by Carl Gans
Taxa named by John Visser